Keystone is a city in Benton County, Iowa, United States. The population was 599 at the time of the 2020 census. It is part of the Cedar Rapids Metropolitan Statistical Area.

History
Keystone was platted in 1881 when the Chicago, Milwaukee, and St. Paul Railroad was extended to that point.

Geography

Demographics

2010 census
As of the census of 2010, there were 622 people, 250 households, and 165 families living in the city. The racial makeup of the city was 99.2% White, 0.5% Native American, 0.2% Asian, and 0.2% from two or more races. Hispanic or Latino of any race were 0.6% of the population.

There were 250 households, of which 30.8% had children under the age of 18 living with them, 53.2% were married couples living together, 8.8% had a female householder with no husband present, 4.0% had a male householder with no wife present, and 34.0% were non-families. 32.0% of all households were made up of individuals, and 20.4% had someone living alone who was 65 years of age or older. The average household size was 2.34 and the average family size was 2.93.

The median age in the city was 42.8 years. 24% of residents were under the age of 18; 5.9% were between the ages of 18 and 24; 23% were from 25 to 44; 22.7% were from 45 to 64; and 24.4% were 65 years of age or older. The gender makeup of the city was 45.0% male and 55.0% female.

2000 census
As of the census of 2000, there were 687 people, 273 households, and 174 families living in the city. The racial makeup of the city was 99.42% White, 0.15% African American, and 0.44% from two or more races. Hispanic or Latino of any race were 0.29% of the population.

There were 273 households, out of which 30.4% had children under the age of 18 living with them, 55.3% were married couples living together, 6.2% had a female householder with no husband present, and 35.9% were non-families. 32.6% of all households were made up of individuals, and 22.7% had someone living alone who was 65 years of age or older. The average household size was 2.37 and the average family size was 3.05.

In the city, the population was spread out, with 24.7% under the age of 18, 8.2% from 18 to 24, 23.6% from 25 to 44, 15.4% from 45 to 64, and 28.1% who were 65 years of age or older. The median age was 40 years. For every 100 females, there were 87.2 males. For every 100 females age 18 and over, there were 82.0 males.

The median income for a household in the city was $36,458, and the median income for a family was $48,750. Males had a median income of $33,333 versus $19,375 for females. The per capita income for the city was $18,215. About 1.7% of families and 2.7% of the population were below the poverty line, including 2.4% of those under age 18 and 1.4% of those age 65 or over.

Education
Benton Community School District operates local public schools.

Notable people

Tim Kapucian (born 1967), Iowa State Senator from the 20th District 
Monte Merkel (1916–1981), American football player

References

External links

 
City-Data Comprehensive statistical data and more about Keystone

Cities in Benton County, Iowa
Cities in Iowa
Cedar Rapids, Iowa metropolitan area
1881 establishments in Iowa